M-pact is an American pop-jazz vocal group based in Los Angeles, California.  Founded in June 1995, the band is known for their award-winning vocal arrangements, recordings, and music videos.  The name "m-pact" is meant to signify an agreement (or "pact") between the band members to always remain true to the musical and artistic vision of the group.  This 'music-pact' began as 5-man ensemble in Seattle, Washington.  Conceptually, the founders of m-pact sought to create a group which would combine the harmonic structure and arranging style of vocal jazz ensembles like Take 6 and the New York Voices with a powerful beatbox-driven vocal rhythm section found in groups like Rockapella and The House Jacks.  The membership has changed over the years, and the sound of the group has fluctuated to reflect the unique voices of each iteration of the band.  However, despite these changes, they have maintained a consistent artistic vision, and to this day they remain true to the original 'pact' of its founding members.

M-pact's commercial recordings include 5 full-length albums, a 2-volume 'greatest hits' collection, 4 EPs, and at least 12 single-song releases.  They have received numerous awards, and have been included on multiple compilations and "best of" collections.  While in Seattle, the group provided studio vocals for several comedy/parody albums (known as "Twisted Tunes") produced by the well-known radio personality Bob Rivers.  They also recorded the theme song for Disney animated holiday special "Seasons of Giving".  Their original song "If I Lost You" was re-recorded in Korean and used as the theme song for a Korean soap opera.  More recently, m-pact have twice been a featured performer on the PBS special "LA Holiday Celebration" broadcast live from Dorothy Chandler Pavilion, and were an opening act for Jay Leno at McCallum Theatre in Palm Desert, California.

History

The Seattle years (1995-2004) 
The band was formed in Seattle, Washington, in 1995 by Marco Cassone, Trist Curless, Jonathan Gonzales, Carl Kelley, and Matthew Selby. Trist, Jonathan, and Matthew were music students together in the jazz department of the University of Northern Colorado, while Marco and Carl were professional singers in Seattle.  Marco and Trist had a mutual friend who sang in the professional a cappella group The Coats.  After this mutual friend learned that both Marco and Trist had similar visions for starting a vocal group, he made the introduction.  The two had several phone calls to "audition" each other and realized almost immediately that they did indeed have much in common.  So, after a few discussions, it was decided that the 3 Coloradans would relocate to Seattle and the group would be founded there.  At first, they decided to call themselves Flipside.  However, after discovering that this name was already trademarked by another band, they decided on the name m-pact.

Once everyone had settled in Seattle, they immediately began rehearsing, learning repertoire, and looking for small gigs around the city.  m-pact's first public performance was at the consumer electronics store Incredible Universe in Auburn, Washington.  From there, they continued to rehearse, hustle, self-promote, and accept whatever gigs they could do between their day jobs.  In early 1996, m-pact's first big breakthrough came when they competed in and won the national a cappella competition, the Harmony Sweepstakes.  Not only did they win first prize, they also took home the award for "Audience Favorite".  Soon after, the band released its first album, It's All About Harmony, which would go on to win 2 Contemporary A Cappella Recording Awards (CARAs).  Having just won the Harmony Sweepstakes, and with their first album receiving critical acclaim, m-pact was making waves in the a cappella community, and it was clear that they were about to be very busy.

Recognizing that the band was moving in direction of full-time touring and performing, Carl decided to leave the group and was replaced by Britt Quentin in early 1997.  Britt was a singer and arranger from Detroit who had studied jazz and classical voice at Wayne State University.  His uniquely bright timbre and extraordinarily high range would help to define m-pact's sound from that point forward.  Additionally, the creativity and complexity of his arrangements were largely responsible for elevating m-pact's standing in the world of a cappella groups and vocal jazz ensembles.

Later in 1997, Jonathan decided to leave the band, citing vocal health issues and concerns as a deciding factor.  After a nation-wide search, the high-tenor / alto position was won by Greg Whipple, who was a studio vocalist and full-time performer at Walt Disney World in Orlando, Florida.  Soon after Greg joined the group, m-pact began recording their sophomore album, 2.  This new recording, which consisted of 9 original compositions and 1 cover tune ("Fantasy" by Earth, Wind & Fire), was released in the summer of 1998 and demonstrated the band's tremendous growth as arrangers, songwriters, and studio musicians during the two years since their debut album.  The album won 1 CARA for Best Pop/Rock Cover Song for "Fantasy".

Almost immediately, m-pact began work on their first holiday album.  The concept for this project was to commission arrangements by some of the world's top vocal arrangers.  In addition to arrangements penned by band members Matthew and Marco, The Carol Commission featured charts by Randy Crenshaw, Michele Weir, Jason Smith, Roger Treece, April Arabian-Tini, Yumiko Matsuoka-Young, Morgan Ames, and Cedric Dent. The resulting product was a one-of-a-kind showcase of vocal arranging and studio production.  Released in late 1999, the album would win 2 CARAs for Best Holiday Album and Best Holiday Song (for "Caroling, Caroling"). But, perhaps more importantly, this album put m-pact on the map as one of the top vocal jazz ensembles in the world.

Soon thereafter, Matthew made the decision to leave the group and relocate to southern California.  He has since gone on to have a stellar career as a musician and music director for the Walt Disney Company and Disney theme parks around the world.  Matthew was replaced by Seattle native Jake Moulton, who had been a member of the local a cappella band Kickshaw.

In the late 1990s and early 2000s, m-pact was touring full-time all over North America – in some years performing more than 200 shows per year.  During this time they also began to make forays into international markets, including tours to Europe (Germany and Italy) and southeast Asia (Japan and Singapore).  In 2001, their album 2 was re-packaged and released in Japan, with distribution by Sony subsidiary Fab Records.  In support of this release, they toured throughout Japan, including a national appearance on Fuji TV.

In 2001, Greg Whipple left the group to pursue a studio career in Los Angeles.  He was replaced temporarily by Steve Wallace, and then eventually Rudy Cardenas – another Denver native and graduate of UNC-Greeley.  While continuing to tour year-round – including their first trip to Africa for the 2003 Tabarka Jazz Festival – m-pact found time to work on studio projects.  In 2001 and 2003, they printed two different EPs (with some cross-over material) which represented several promising works-in-progress.  Still, the group had not decided on a firm direction for their next full-length album.  So, the decision was made to record their first-ever live album.  This double-disc project was recorded in early 2004, and was taken from a series of performances at the group's favorite hometown venue, The Triple Door.  It was also around this time that m-pact began planning their move to Los Angeles, California.

The Los Angeles years (2004–2016) 
In May 2004, m-pact relocated to Los Angeles, California.  The primary purpose of this move was to provide additional opportunities for the band members to find substantial work in the music industry when not on the road with m-pact.  It was also around this time that the group expanded to a sextet.  Tenor vocalist / beatboxer Jeff Smith relocated from Kansas City, Missouri, to join m-pact in June 2004.  He had made a name for himself in the a cappella community as the leader and music director of the successful midwest vocal group, measureXmeasure ('measure by measure").

m-pact continued to tour across North America, as well as several tours and headline concerts in Europe.  Notable events / venues included the Festilac Music Festival (Switzerland) with R&B sensation Boyz II Men; the Vocal Jazz Summit (Germany); Fandango Music Festival (Italy); Veneto Jazz Festival (Italy); Jazzkaar (Estonia), and many more.  In between tours, the band also renewed their efforts to complete their long-awaited new studio project.  In June 2006, they released the eponymous album m-pact – a 13-song collection of jazz standards and original music.  The album was released on Primarily A Cappella Records, and was featured in JazzTimes 2006 Year-in-Review Issue. The recording won two CARAs for "Best Jazz Album" and "Best Original Song" for the Britt Quentin-penned tune "You Need to Know".

Later in 2006, m-pact baritone/beatboxer Jake Moulton announced his departure from the band due to vocal health concerns.  The baritone position remained unfilled for about  years, but during that time the band toured with several terrific sub singers – including Tonoccus McClain, singer-songwriter (and former Chanticleer counter-tenor) Matt Alber, and founding m-pact member Matt Selby.  In November of that year, the band returned to southeast Asia for performances in Singapore and Jakarta, Indonesia for the Jakarta Jazz Festival (JakJazz).

In 2007, m-pact power-tenor / alto Rudy Cardenas gained notoriety for his appearance on season 6 of the hit TV show American Idol.  Rudy had a successful run to Hollywood, including a show-stopping performance of "How Deep is Your Love" with eventual runner-up Blake Lewis.  Although he was one of the final 24 contestants, he was eliminated after his performance of Free Ride failed to overcome the Sanjaya voting phenomenon that swept through that season's competition.  On the heals of his American Idol run, Rudy decided to leave m-pact in order to pursue a solo career.  He was replaced by LA session singer, Fletcher Sheridan (who had previously filled in for Rudy while he was filming).

Later that year, m-pact was one of four groups selected to perform in an international a cappella festival / concert called "Amazing Voice", which took place in August 2007 in South Korea.  The other participating groups were The Real Group (Sweden), Rajaton (Finland), and The Idea of North (Australia).  The groups performed 2 preview concerts at Phoenix Park in Gangwon-do, South Korea prior to their 2-night sold-out run at the Sejong Performing Arts Center in Seoul.  The festival was such a huge success that it was immediately re-booked for a 2nd run in August 2008.

In early 2008, m-pact selected LA vocalist David Loucks as the full-time singer for their baritone position.  Over the next 2 years, the group made several more overseas appearances, including a headline performance at the Internationales Festival für Vokalmusik (Leipzig, Germany); a 3-city Korean run of "Amazing Voice" (Daejon, S. Korea; Seongnam, S. Korea; Seoul, S. Korea); a short tour to Singapore, and a return to Tokyo and Seoul in 2009.  Near the end of 2009, Britt Quentin left the group to join the London cast of the new West End show "Thriller Live".  This prompted a shift in personnel, as Fletcher moved up to the soprano part, and the alto position was filled by Jarrett Johnson.  Jarrett had recently relocated to LA after a successful career with Illinois a cappella ensemble Chapter 6.

For the next few years, the band continued to perform sporadically throughout North America, averaging around 40 shows per year.  Venues included performing arts centers, jazz festivals, and educational outreach events.  In 2010, David was replaced by Denmark native Morten Kier, who had previously toured full-time with renowned Danish ensemble Basix.  With this line-up, m-pact began recording their first music videos for release on YouTube in 2014.  They filmed a cinematic short film for Fletcher's arrangement of the Michael Jackson tune Human Nature, a video of the Stevie Wonder classic Signed, Sealed, Delivered I'm Yours, and a collaboration video with New York a cappella group Duwende.  The group was also one of the guest artists for the inaugural year of A Cappella Academy, a summer program founded by Sing-Off arranger Rob Dietz, Pentatonix producer/arranger, Ben Bram, and founding bass of Pentatonix, Avi Kaplan.

In late 2014, Morten left m-pact to focus on his solo career, and he was replaced by singer Kenton Chen.  Kenton had previously been a member of the LA a cappella group The Backbeats, which had a successful run on the NBC a cappella competition show The Sing Off.  He was also a featured vocalist with the retro jazz performance group Postmodern Jukebox.  Over the next couple of years, the group headlined the Los Angeles A Cappella Festival, were a guest performer for The Sing Off Tour, returned as a guest artist for the 2nd year of the A Cappella Academy, and was a featured performer for the American Choral Directors Association (ACDA) conference in Pasadena, California.  They also headlined the Brandon Jazz Festival in Brandon, Manitoba.  Along with these achievements, each of the guys continued to be more and more in demand for competing work outside the group.  As a result, individual scheduling conflicts made it difficult to book substantial tours or make progress on recording projects and videos.  In early 2016, the band's two remaining founders – Trist and Marco – decided to retire from the group.  Trist had already accepted a position as the new bass singer for vocal ensemble The Manhattan Transfer.  Marco was preparing to relocate to northern California to pursue a consulting career in organizational management.  With the departure of the band's last founding members, the next era of the m-pact would be left in the hands of an all-new line-up for the first time in its history.

"m-pact 2.0" (2016–present) 
After Trist and Marco announced their retirement, Fletcher, Jarrett, and Kenton also decided to retire from the group.  This left 12-year band member Jeff with the need to put together a new ensemble – almost entirely from the ground up.  Fortunately, there were several talented singers who had subbed with m-pact over the previous few years who had the skills and experience to do the job.  Tracy Robertson (bass), Drew Tablak (soprano), and Aaron Schumacher (alto) had all performed with the group numerous times, and they were now ready to join the group full-time.  The next call was to Jamond McCoy, who was a recent graduate of the stellar vocal jazz program at California State University-Long Beach, and who Jeff had seen perform at the ACDA conference earlier that year.  To round up the first line-up, Jeff called on Jared Jenkins, who had been a teacher at A Cappella Academy, and who had also performed with Tracy at Berklee College of Music.  With this group of singers, m-pact was able to fulfill several contractual obligations for the summer of 2016.  However, Jared indicated that he was only available to fill in temporarily.  So, in September of that year the band welcomed Andy Degan to their ranks, and the newest version of m-pact was officially formed.

Later that year, m-pact once again joined forces with NYC group Duwende to headline the Kettering A Cappella Festival in Ohio.  They also filmed a live-in-studio recording of "Silent Night" for the acclaimed YouTube channel The Black and White Sessions.  From there, m-pact continued to tour and gig throughout North America.  In spring 2017, they were a featured act for the Disney Food and Wine Festival at Disney California Adventure. Later that year, they began recording and filming music videos again.  Their first release was a live performance of "Dont You Worry 'bout a Thing", followed up by a fiery rendition of Jon Bellion's "Guillotine", which was nominated for several A Cappella Video Awards.

In 2018, the band launched into their first substantial recording project in almost 12 years.  The result was the critically acclaimed 8-song EP Wonderful World.  Released on August 24, 2018, Wonderful World was an eclectic collection of 7 brand-new tracks combined with the group's 2018 CARA-winning single, "Come Together". In addition to new vocal arrangements by band members Andy, Jamond, and Tracy Robertson, the group also culled the m-pact archives to discover a treasure trove of hidden gems which had never been recorded - and in some cases, never performed - before. "This project was an opportunity for us to make a statement about who m-pact is today", said artistic director Jeff, "while also shining a light on the legacy of the group's musical history, which we're so proud to be a part of."  That same year, m-pact also released new music videos for "Come Together" and "We Can Work it Out", both of which went on to be nominated for or win several 2019 A Cappella Video Awards.  Additionally, Wonderful World won 2 awards at the 2019 CARAs - Best Jazz Album, and Best Jazz Song for "Stay".

In January 2019, m-pact was once again a guest artist for the Jazz Education Network conference in Reno, NV.  Later that month, they embarked on their first international tour in nearly 10 years.  They were a headlining guest artist for the London A Cappella Festival and also performed concerts in Tallinn, Estonia; Viljandi, Estonia, and Copenhagen, Denmark.  Throughout the spring and summer, the band made several guest appearances at vocal jazz, a cappella, and choral festivals around the U.S.  They filmed another live video - a medley of songs by Earth, Wind & Fire – which was released in August 2019. This video also won a 2020 A Cappella Video award for Best Live Video.  In November 2019, m-pact launched their first-ever Vocal Festival in conjunction with the music department of Kansas City Kansas Community College.  The 2nd festival is planned for November 2020.

During the year 2020, m-pact is celebrating their 25th anniversary, and they have announced a variety of anniversary projects – including a reunion concert and a recording/video project featuring past and present band members.  In March 2020, they released a new video of their well-known version of "My Favorite Things", and they are currently recording a new full-length album – arranged and produced by Grammy-nominated composer Roger Treece – scheduled to be released in late 2020 or early 2021.

On November 23rd 2021, the group announced via their Facebook page that Los Angeles based producer Daniel Weidlein would be joining the group as the replacement bass vocalist for departing member, Tracy Robertson.

Discography and recordings

Awards and nominations

References

External links
 Official website 
 m-pact on Spotify 
 m-pact on Apple Music

Professional a cappella groups
Musical groups from Los Angeles
Jazz musicians from California
Vocal jazz ensembles